The Nova Coden is a Polish autogyro under development by Nova Sp. z.o.o. of Gdynia. Intended to be type certified, it is planned that the aircraft will be supplied complete and ready-to-fly.

Design and development
The Coden features a single main rotor, a two-seats-in tandem enclosed cockpit with a windshield, tricycle landing gear with wheel pants, plus a tail caster and a modified turbocharged four-cylinder, liquid and air-cooled, four stroke  Rotax 912 engine in pusher configuration.

The aircraft fuselage has an unusual multi-faceted design, based on the boxfish. The design allows the mounting of additional baggage and special mission equipment and incorporates patented main landing gear.

As of 2015 a prototype was reported to have been completed and certification flight testing was expected to begin.

Specifications (Coden)

See also
List of rotorcraft

References

External links

Coden
2010s Polish sport aircraft
Single-engined pusher autogyros